Jamal Khan Mandokhail (born 12 November 1961) is the Justice of the Supreme Court of Pakistan since 9 August 2021. He was a former Chief Justice of Balochistan High Court from 5 October 2019 to 9 August 2021.

References

1961 births
Living people
Judges of the Balochistan High Court
Pakistani judges
Justices of the Supreme Court of Pakistan